Romen Theatre in Moscow, Russia, is the oldest and the most famous of Romani theatres in the world. The theatre is a key object of Romani culture in Russia, and from the moment of its foundation in 1931, it has been a centre of attraction for Romani artists in Russia.

Forerunners of Romen Theatre 

In the 18th and 19th centuries, choruses of Ruska Roma existed in Moscow and Saint Petersburg.

At the end of the 19th century, a conductor of one of Romani choruses, Nikolai Shishkin created the first ever Romani theatre troupe. The first appearance of the troupe was in the operetta Gypsy Songs in Characters, with the main troupe of Arcadia Theatre. This was in 1886. The operetta ran for several years. On 13 April 1887 the first performance of Strauss's operetta The Gypsy Baron with Roma (Shishkin's troupe) playing the roles of Roma took place in the Maly Theatre.

On 20 March 1888 the premiere of the very first Romani language operetta Children of the Forests was staged in the Maly Theatre. It was performed solely by the Romani troupe. The production ran for 18 years and was a great success.

In 1892, Shishkin produced a new operetta, Gypsy Life.

In the 1920s, many Romani ensembles of singers, dancers and musicians performed in the USSR.

Theatre history 

On 24 January 1931 the Romani theatre studio "Indo-Romen" opened in Moscow. Within a month, the studio performed its first work.

The first director and the first music composer of "Indo-Romen" were Jewish activists, Moishe Goldblat and Semen Bugachevsky. Alexander Tyshler was most often invited for stage design.

On 16 December 1931 the studio showed its first full musical-dramathic performance Life on Wheels. It consisted of three acts and was based on a play by Romani author Alexandr Germano. After that performance, the studio was renamed the Romen Theatre. The first theatre director was Georgy Lebedev (a Rusko Rom).

Since 1940, the theatre does all its performances in Russian.

The current theatre director (2008) is Nikolai Slichenko, a Romani actor famous in Russia.

Selected notable figures associated with Romen Theatre 

 Sasha Kolpakov, guitarist, vocalist, composer
 Valentina Ponomaryova, actor, singer
 Nikolai Slichenko, actor
 Nina Dudarova, poet, teacher, writer and translator

Literature

See also 
 Romani society and culture

References

External links 

 Romen Theatre official site 
 About Romen theatre (in English)

Theatres in Moscow
Romani culture
Romani in Russia